Eric Whiteley was a rugby union international who represented England in 1931.

Early life
Whiteley was born on 20 July 1904, in Croydon.

Rugby union career
Whiteley made his international debut on 21 March 1931 at Murrayfield in the Scotland vs England match.
Of the two matches he played for his national side, he was on the winning side on neither occasion.
He played his final match for England on 6 April 1931  at Colombes in the France vs England match.

References

1904 births
1973 deaths
English rugby union players
England international rugby union players
Rugby union fullbacks
People educated at Dulwich College
Rugby union players from Croydon